Kim Min-sung (born December 17, 1988) is South Korean professional baseball infielder for the LG Twins of the KBO League.

References

External links
Career statistics and player information from the KBO League
Kim Min-sung at heroes-baseball.co.kr 

Kiwoom Heroes players
Lotte Giants players
KBO League infielders
South Korean baseball players
Baseball players from Seoul
1988 births
Living people
Asian Games medalists in baseball
Baseball players at the 2014 Asian Games
Medalists at the 2014 Asian Games
Asian Games gold medalists for South Korea